is a Japanese manga series by Hari Tokeino. It has been serialized in Hakusensha's shōjo manga magazine LaLa since 2009, and has been collected in twenty-three tankōbon volumes. A 12-episode anime television series adaptation by Brain's Base aired between January 7 and March 25, 2018. An OVA episode was announced in June 2018 and was bundled with the 7th DVD and Blu-Ray releases of the show.

Plot
After the sudden death of their parents on a plane crash, two young brothers named Ryūichi Kashima (a freshman in high school) and his younger brother Kotarō (a preschooler) are left orphaned and having no place to call home. The chairwoman of the prestigious Morinomiya Academy offers to take the boys into her care, giving them a new house and free tuition, on the condition that Ryuichi helps out with the school's daycare center while also attending normal classes during school hours.

Characters

Students

He and his brother Kotaro lost their parents in an airplane accident, leaving them orphaned. They are taken in by Morinomiya in exchange for him helping with the school's babysitter club. Ryūichi is a kind-hearted and friendly boy who easily befriends people around him. He loves his little brother Kotaro and would do anything for him, trying his best to support him. He takes a liking to the babysitting activities, and all the infants that are drawn to him.

A boy in Morinomiya Academy, the son of Shizuka Kamitani and Taizō Hebihara, a science teacher in the school, and Taka's older brother. He becomes friends with Ryuichi and often hangs with him as one of his closest friends. He is mostly expressionless, quiet, and rarely says more than strictly needed. Although he often smacks Taka in order to have him behave (which becomes a recurring running gag), in reality Hayato loves and cares deeply for his brother, although he never openly states it toward him. He eventually joins the babysitting club as an official member, doing activities in there and in the baseball club.

A student in Morinomiya Academy's Special Class. She is a very studious girl but is socially awkward. Although she can be blunt and sometimes offensive, she is not a bad person at heart; rather, she finds it difficult to interact with people believing studying hard is all she excels at, and can become easily saddened, which shows that she can be sensitive. She develops a crush on Ryūichi to which he is oblivious, and recurrently interacts with the babysitting club and its children. The kids like her, but her stern demeanor can scare them at times. 

A second-year student in the Morinomiya Academy Advanced Class. He is a handsome and kind-hearted boy who is very popular with the girls. He has a passion for cute children, but gets nosebleeds whenever he interacts with them, making him appear like a pervert.

A schoolmate of Ryūichi and an old friend of Tomoya Yagi with shaggy black hair hanging over his eyes. His sloppy appearance belies his dedication as a student and hard worker, as well as his caring personality. He has several younger brothers and sisters, and although normally not allowed, he has gotten permission to work a part-time job to support his family.

A kind but painfully shy young girl and one of Ryūichi's classmates. She has developed a crush on him, but cannot bring herself to confess her feelings to him. Although initially a love rival with Maria Inomata, she gradually begins to consider her as her best friend.

A somewhat pushy high school boy who seeks to win the heart of Yukari Sawatori, despite the fact that she is happily married. Later on he develops a crush on Ryūichi when he mistakes him for a girl while the latter is wearing a wig. In his initial appearance he is shown to dislike children, but he acquires somewhat of a soft spot for them as time passes. At one point Usaida bribes him to watch over Kotaro while the toddler embarks on his first errand, and he keeps his anonymity by wearing a bag over his head.

Children

Ryuichi's younger brother. Kotaro is a toddler who loves his older brother and sticks with him. He is taken care of in the babysitter club where he gets along with the other kids his age. He is overall the most quiet of the infants, and is often expressionless in dangerous or even comical situations.

The younger Kamitani brother and one of the children in the daycare. Boisterous and stubborn, his attitude often puts him at odds with his older brother and occasionally other children. Although he may never admit it himself, he deeply cares for his older brother and aspires to be like him.

 One of the Mamizuka twins. Takuma is a very cheerful and outgoing toddler and is rarely seen without a smile on his face.

 The second of the Mamizuka twins. Unlike his brother, he is very shy and prone to tears at the best of times. He is very close to Takuma and is rarely seen without him. Unassertive, he often copies or finishes Takuma's sentences.

 The oldest toddler in the daycare. Smarter than her peers, she speaks relatively eloquently and politely, although she is not above getting into shenanigans herself. She is rarely seen without her favorite giraffe plushie.

 The youngest child in the daycare. She is often carried on the back of one of the babysitters, usually Usaida.

Hayato and Taka's cousin. He arrived at the babysitting club after his mother got sick and became bedridden.

Parents/ Guardians

The Chairwoman of Morinomiya Academy who lost her son and daughter-in-law in the same accident that killed the Kashima siblings' parents. Witnessing them during the funeral, she decides to take them both under her care under the condition that Ryuichi helps with the babysitter club, providing him with a house and school. Although she tends to be strict and work driven, she reveals a softer side to herself in time, constantly monitoring the siblings and caring for them in her own way. Her most striking feature is her abundant hair, which Kotaro claims is "shaggy" (もじゃもじゃ mojamoja), and calls her that as a nickname.

Youko's butler and attendant. He watches over the siblings and treats to their needs. Totally unfazeable, he reacts with dry humor and tasteless jokes to any peculiarities he chances upon. Usually when Ryuuichi is busy with exams, Saikawa takes his place at the babysitter club to help take care of the children. He also becomes friends with Usaida.

A caretaker in the babysitter club. He is most of the time seen sleeping on the job and is shown to have a rather demotivated behavior, claiming this is because the chairman is stingy. Although he does not seem to work more than what is strictly required, he does seem to care for the kids and Ryuichi. In the manga, it is revealed that he wanted to be a teacher. In his backstory, he became the way he is, being disappointed on his father's choice of career path after he was laid off.

Kirin's mother is a cold-looking and soft-spoken but caring woman teaching Drama at Morinomiya Academy.

A freelance photographer, Kirin's father, and Yayoi's husband. He is very protective of his daughter Kirin, forbidding her from kissing or even getting close to any of the boys at the daycare, especially Kotaro. The two are very close, even though they are both toddlers. Satoru also becomes extremely jealous whenever his wife Yayoi speaks to someone of the opposite sex. He is a very bubbly person whenever his daughter is around and is always seen with a digital camera in his hand to take pictures.

Midori's mother, a school secretary at Morinomiya Academy, is a gentle beauty who is married to a loving but often-absent archeologist.

Midori's father and Yukari's husband. His job as an archaeologist often keeps him away from home on expeditions; his face is rarely shown and the lower part of his face is usually covered up with a huge beard (in the manga, his entire face is visible without his beard). He has a deep, booming voice in the anime series that makes him sound like someone much older than he actually is.

Kazuma and Takuma's mother. She is a P.E. teacher at Morinomiya Academy. She shares a cheerful personality with her son Takuma and often comforts her more timid son Kazuma, as well as her equally timid husband.

Kazuma and Takuma's father. He's also a famous actor and is very popular with his fans. However, his fame has come at the cost of not being able to see his sons as often as he would like, resulting in Kazuma and Takuma's estrangement from him. With Ryūichi's encouragement, however, he eventually overcomes that barrier. He is a crybaby and contrary to his actor persona, he is very shy and emotional, but also kind. He commonly appears in sketchy disguises to avoid being recognized as a celebrity.

Hayato and Taka's mother and Taizo's ex-wife; she has a laid-back and easygoing personality. She can be stern at times but she does love her children. She works as a science teacher at Morinomiya Academy. She has a large amount of patience when dealing with her talkative and misbehaving son, Taka, sometimes gazing at him as a loving mother would, but becomes assertive and angry when she is rubbed the wrong way especially by her teenager son, Hayato, or ex-husband, Taizou. She has a tendency of hitting Hayato on the head when he does something foolish or disagreeable. Like Hayato, she extends this treatment to Usaida at times when he's slacking off on the job. 

Hayato and Taka's divorced father and Shizuka's ex-husband. Just like Hayato, he is usually expressionless but he has a more frightening appearance than his oldest son. He is very strict and has zero tolerance when comes to his students, often marking them absent even if they are only a few minutes late for school. He forces them to do chores under harsh deadlines, even during their free time, if they are unable to reply. He works as a chemistry teacher at Morinomiya Academy.

Media

Manga
The manga has been published by Hakusensha, and in LaLa's magazine since 2008, and as of July 2022, 23 volumes have been released in Japan. The series has also been released in French by Glénat Editions and in Chinese by Tong Li Publishing.

Volume list

Novel
The series's first novel, written by Saya Kōzuki, was published by Hakusensha on March 3, 2018.

Anime
A 12-episode anime television series adaptation by Brain's Base aired between January 7, 2018, to March 25, 2018, on Tokyo MX, Sun TV and BS11. First announced on March 21, 2017, the series is directed by Shūsei Morishita with scripts written by Yuuko Kakihara and music by Ruka Kawada. Crunchyroll streamed the series. An OVA episode was announced in June 2018 and was bundled with the 7th DVD and Blu-Ray release.

References

External links
 

Anime series based on manga
Brain's Base
Comedy anime and manga
Crunchyroll anime
Hakusensha manga
Muse Communication
School life in anime and manga
Shōjo manga
Slice of life anime and manga
Tokyo MX original programming